Costarina is a genus of spiders in the family Oonopidae. It was first described in 2011 by Platnick & Dupérré. , it contains 108 species, found in the Americas from Mexico to Brazil.

Species
Costarina comprises the following species:
Costarina abdita (Chickering, 1968)
Costarina aguirre Platnick & Berniker, 2014
Costarina almirante Platnick & Berniker, 2014
Costarina alturas Platnick & Berniker, 2014
Costarina anchicaya Platnick & Berniker, 2014
Costarina antonio Platnick & Berniker, 2014
Costarina azul Platnick & Berniker, 2014
Costarina barbilla Platnick & Berniker, 2014
Costarina belmopan Platnick & Dupérré, 2012
Costarina blanco Platnick & Dupérré, 2012
Costarina bocas Platnick & Berniker, 2014
Costarina bochil Platnick & Dupérré, 2012
Costarina branstetteri Platnick & Dupérré, 2012
Costarina cahui Platnick & Dupérré, 2012
Costarina carara Platnick & Berniker, 2014
Costarina carrillo Platnick & Berniker, 2014
Costarina ceiba Platnick & Dupérré, 2012
Costarina cerere Platnick & Berniker, 2014
Costarina cerrocol Platnick & Berniker, 2014
Costarina chiles Platnick & Berniker, 2014
Costarina chiriqui Platnick & Berniker, 2014
Costarina choco Platnick & Berniker, 2014
Costarina chonta Platnick & Berniker, 2014
Costarina cima Platnick & Berniker, 2014
Costarina clara Platnick & Berniker, 2014
Costarina cofradia Platnick & Dupérré, 2012
Costarina coma Platnick & Dupérré, 2012
Costarina concinna (Chickering, 1968)
Costarina cortes Platnick & Dupérré, 2012
Costarina cruces Platnick & Berniker, 2014
Costarina cruz Platnick & Berniker, 2014
Costarina cuerici Platnick & Berniker, 2014
Costarina cusuco Platnick & Dupérré, 2012
Costarina diablo Platnick & Berniker, 2014
Costarina dura (Chickering, 1951)
Costarina dybasi Platnick & Berniker, 2014
Costarina elena Platnick & Berniker, 2014
Costarina espavel Platnick & Berniker, 2014
Costarina fortuna Platnick & Berniker, 2014
Costarina frantzius Platnick & Berniker, 2014
Costarina gemelo Platnick & Berniker, 2014
Costarina gorgona Platnick & Berniker, 2014
Costarina gracias Platnick & Dupérré, 2012
Costarina helechal Platnick & Berniker, 2014
Costarina hitoy Platnick & Berniker, 2014
Costarina intempina (Chickering, 1968)
Costarina isidro Platnick & Berniker, 2014
Costarina iviei Platnick & Dupérré, 2012
Costarina izabal Platnick & Dupérré, 2012
Costarina jimenez Platnick & Berniker, 2014
Costarina junio Platnick & Berniker, 2014
Costarina kilambe Platnick & Berniker, 2014
Costarina leones Platnick & Berniker, 2014
Costarina llama Platnick & Dupérré, 2012
Costarina macha Platnick & Dupérré, 2012
Costarina macho Platnick & Berniker, 2014
Costarina maritza Platnick & Berniker, 2014
Costarina meridina (Chickering, 1968)
Costarina mixtepec Platnick & Dupérré, 2012
Costarina monte Platnick & Berniker, 2014
Costarina mooreorum Platnick & Berniker, 2014
Costarina morales Platnick & Dupérré, 2012
Costarina muralla Platnick & Dupérré, 2012
Costarina murphyorum Platnick & Berniker, 2014
Costarina musun Platnick & Dupérré, 2012
Costarina naja Platnick & Dupérré, 2012
Costarina nara Platnick & Berniker, 2014
Costarina oaxaca Platnick & Dupérré, 2012
Costarina obtina (Chickering, 1968)
Costarina olancho Platnick & Dupérré, 2012
Costarina osa Platnick & Berniker, 2014
Costarina otun Platnick & Berniker, 2014
Costarina palmar Platnick & Berniker, 2014
Costarina parabio Platnick & Berniker, 2014
Costarina parapalmar Platnick & Berniker, 2014
Costarina paraplena Platnick & Berniker, 2014
Costarina penshurst Platnick & Berniker, 2014
Costarina peten Platnick & Dupérré, 2012
Costarina pittier Platnick & Berniker, 2014
Costarina pity Platnick & Berniker, 2014
Costarina plena (O. Pickard-Cambridge, 1894)
Costarina poas Platnick & Berniker, 2014
Costarina quepos Platnick & Berniker, 2014
Costarina rafael Platnick & Berniker, 2014
Costarina ramon Platnick & Berniker, 2014
Costarina recondita (Chickering, 1951)
Costarina reventazon Platnick & Berniker, 2014
Costarina saladito Platnick & Berniker, 2014
Costarina san Platnick & Berniker, 2014
Costarina sasaima Platnick & Berniker, 2014
Costarina seclusa (Chickering, 1951)
Costarina selva Platnick & Berniker, 2014
Costarina semibio Platnick & Berniker, 2014
Costarina sepultura Platnick & Dupérré, 2012
Costarina sorkini Platnick & Berniker, 2014
Costarina subplena Platnick & Dupérré, 2012
Costarina suiza Platnick & Berniker, 2014
Costarina superplena Platnick & Berniker, 2014
Costarina taraira Platnick & Berniker, 2014
Costarina tela Platnick & Dupérré, 2012
Costarina tskui Platnick & Berniker, 2014
Costarina ubicki Platnick & Berniker, 2014
Costarina upala Platnick & Berniker, 2014
Costarina veragua Platnick & Berniker, 2014
Costarina viejo Platnick & Berniker, 2014
Costarina waspuk Platnick & Dupérré, 2012
Costarina watina (Chickering, 1968)
Costarina yotoco Platnick & Berniker, 2014

References

Oonopidae
Araneomorphae genera
Spiders of Mexico
Spiders of Central America
Spiders of South America